During the 2006–07 English football season, Tranmere Rovers competed in Football League One.

First-team squad
Squad at end of season

Left club during season

League table

Notes

References

Tranmere Rovers F.C. seasons
Tranmere Rovers F.C.